The provost of Peterhead was the head of the Peterhead burgh council in Scotland. Provosts were elected by the council and served not only as the chairman of that body, but as a figurehead for the entire town. They were equivalent in many ways to the institution of mayor. The council was abolished in 1975.

Each of the 32 Scottish local authorities elects a convener or provost, but it is only the four main cities, Glasgow, Edinburgh, Aberdeen and Dundee that have a lord provost. This is enshrined in the Local Government etc. (Scotland) Act 1994.

The Provost of Peterhead painted by Edward Burton after Sir John Watson-Gordon, is of Roderick Grey, the portrait now being in the Scottish National Gallery.

Provosts
1833–1834: George Arbuthnot of Invernettie, cotton manufacturer
1834–1843: Thomas Arbuthnot of Meethill, shipowner
1843–1857: Roderick Grey, WS, solicitor
1857–1860: Alexander Anderson, shipowner
1860–1885: William Alexander of Whitehill, solicitor/bank agent
1885–1888: John Henderson Will of Downiehills, fish curer
1888–1899: John Smith, manufacturer
1899–1918: William Hutchison Leask, commission agent and drifter owner
1918–1927: James Hutchison Catto, commission agent and herring exporter
1927–1930: James Milne, coal merchant
1930–1936: John B Dickie, timber merchant
1936–1940: Max J. L. Schultze, herring exporter
1940–1946: Robert S. Dingwall, gents outfitter
1946–1950: William McD. Gordon, cabinet maker
1950–1956: John A. Dickie, timber merchant
1956–1965: Robert Forman, company director, boat owner
1965–1971: Edward A. Duncan, grocer
1971–1975: Thomas L. Smith, headmaster

References

Politics of the county of Aberdeen
Lists of provosts of places in Scotland
Provosts